Robert Seethaler (born 1966) is an Austrian novelist, and actor.

Awards and honours
 2005: Tankred-Dorst-Drehbuchpreis der Drehbuchwerkstatt München for Heartbreakin’
 2007: Debütpreis des Buddenbrookhauses for Die Biene und der Kurt
 2008: Alfred-Döblin-Stipendium / Akademie der Künste Berlin
 2008: Kulturpreis des Landes Niederösterreich
 2008: My Mother, My Bride and I (dt. Die zweite Frau) at the International Toronto Film festival
 2009: Spreewald Literaturstipendium
 2009: Grimme-Preis for Die zweite Frau (Best Film)
 2009: Nominated for the Europäischen Medienpreis für Integration
 2011: Staatsstipendium der österreichischen Bundesregierung
 2011: Stipendium des Heinrich-Heine-Hauses der Stadt Lüneburg
 2015: Grimmelshausen-Preis for Ein ganzes Leben
 2016: Shortlisted for the Man Booker International Prize for A Whole Life
 2016: Buchpreis der Wiener Wirtschaft
 2017: Anton Wildgans Prize
 2017: Shortlisted for International DUBLIN Literary Award for A Whole Life
 2018: Rheingau Literatur Preis for Das Feld

Novels translated into English 
  – shortlisted for the 2017 Man Booker International Prize, and the 2017 International DUBLIN Literary Award

References

1966 births
Austrian male novelists
Living people
21st-century Austrian novelists
21st-century Austrian male writers